Semljicola caliginosus is a spider species found in England, Scotland and Russia.

See also 
 List of Linyphiidae species (Q–Z)

References

External links 

Linyphiidae
Spiders of Europe
Spiders of Russia
Spiders described in 1910